The Passion may refer to:

 Passion of Jesus, in Christianity, the Passion is the short final period in the life of Jesus
 The Passion (novel), a 1987 novel by British novelist Jeannette Winterson
 The Passion (franchise)
 The Passion of the Christ, a 2004 film
 The Passion of Christ (Strasbourg), 15th century paintings
 The Passion: New Orleans, a 2016 live television event, produced by Tyler Perry
 The Passion (TV serial), a miniseries about Jesus, broadcast in 2008
 The Passion (TV series), a 1999 TV drama series set in Devon

See also 
 Passion (disambiguation)